Jan Poulus (29 January 1916 – 30 November 1991) was a Dutch footballer. He played in one match for the Netherlands national football team in 1940.

References

External links
 

1916 births
1991 deaths
Dutch footballers
Netherlands international footballers
Place of birth missing
Association footballers not categorized by position